Borbotana is a genus of moths of the family Noctuidae. The genus was erected by Francis Walker in 1858.

Species
Borbotana dinawa Bethune-Baker, 1906 New Guinea
Borbotana distorimacula Warren, 1913 New Guinea
Borbotana ekeikei Bethune-Baker, 1906 New Guinea
Borbotana fragmentata Warren, 1913 New Guinea
Borbotana guttata Warren, 1913 New Guinea
Borbotana kebeae Bethune-Baker, 1906 New Guinea
Borbotana nivifascia Walker, 1858 Sumatra, Borneo
Borbotana petrae Behounek, 2000 Philippines
Borbotana piskatschekae Behounek, 2000 Flores

References

Hadeninae